Robert Vadra (born 18 April 1969) is an Indian businessman, entrepreneur and the husband of Priyanka Gandhi. He is the son-in-law of Sonia Gandhi and the brother-in-law of Rahul Gandhi.

Early life and family
Robert Vadra was born to Rajendra and Maureen Vadra on 18 April 1969. His father's family is of Punjabi descent settled in Moradabad district, Uttar Pradesh. His paternal family is originally from Sialkot in present-day Pakistan. Rajendra's father moved to India at the time of partition. His mother Maureen (née McDonagh) is of Scottish origin. Rajendra was a resident of Civil Lines, Moradabad and ran a brass and wood handicrafts business. Vadra has only completed his high school education.

Robert Vadra's brother Richard died by suicide and his sister Michelle died in a car accident in 2001. His father was found dead on April 3, 2009 in City Inn, a guest house in the Yusuf Sarai area of Delhi.

Politics 
In January 2002, Vadra issued a notice in print newspaper distancing himself from his father and brother as they were misusing his relationship with the Nehru–Gandhi family to make money while promising jobs and other favours. Following this, Sonia Gandhi, the then Congress president also issued a notice to all Congress CMs, state unit heads and senior party members to stay away from Vadra and his family.

Until 2012, while Vadra was mostly in the background, he became a target for several opposition parties after the 2012 anti-corruption movement, India against corruption made allegations against him. These allegations got further politicization after several instances of Congress party spokespersons defending allegations on Vadra, stating he was a soft target.

While Vadra is not into active politics he had been actively campaigning for his brother-in-law Rahul Gandhi and mother-in-law Sonia Gandhi. In the Lok Sabha elections of 2019, he campaigned actively across India for several candidates. Recently on his 50th birthday, when asked about his intent to join active politics, Vadra stated it would happen 2–3 years later.

Controversies

DLF land grab case 

In October 2011, he was accused by Arvind Kejriwal of taking an interest-free loan of 650 million and heavy bargains on land from DLF Limited in exchange for political favours. DLF responded that it had dealt with Vadra as a private entrepreneur, that the loan was Business Advance which was given, as per practice of trade, to make payments for land purchased from Vadra, that the company did not sell him land at a discounted price, and that no quid pro quo took place. Corporation Bank has denied ever providing an overdraft facility of that amount. Meanwhile after being asked to vacate the government accommodation at Lodhi estate, Priyanka Vadra shifted to a 5500 sqft 5 bedroom home at a DLF property in Gurugram.

Bikaner land case 
In February 2019, Rajasthan High Court has issued summons to Vadra and his mother Maureen in relation to a 2015 case of illegal land transactions in Kolayat area of Bikaner. The enforcement directorate had filed a case against Vadra's company Skylight hospitality pvt ltd alleging purchase of 69.55 bigha (approx. 28 acres) land in connivance with Rajasthan government officials at sub market rates (7.2 million) and then selling them at exorbitantly higher prices to gain illegal profits. The company had been issued a notice under Prevention of money laundering act in 2016. Subsequently, the company approached Delhi HC and Supreme court in April 2018 for reassessment of their transactions, however the court directed Vadra to appear before the ED and cooperate in investigations. In recent development, the ED has attached the assets of Vadra's company Skylight valued at 46.2 million after Vadra appeared before ED ignoring several previous summons. In January 2020, during his interrogation with the ED, Vadra stated that he had viewed the land locations on Google maps, but could not recollect the source for the funds he used to purchase those.

Gurugram Rajiv Gandhi Trust land grab case

References

Nehru–Gandhi family
People from Moradabad
Living people
1969 births
Anglo-Indian people
Businesspeople from Uttar Pradesh
Indian people of Scottish descent
People charged with corruption